Jalen Marquis Brunson (born August 31, 1996) is an American professional basketball player for the New York Knicks of the National Basketball Association (NBA). He played college basketball for Villanova University, where he was the National Player of the Year as a junior and won two national championships.

Brunson ended his junior year of high school for Stevenson High School in Lincolnshire, Illinois as one of the top point guards in the country. He was selected as the 2014 Illinois Boys Basketball Gatorade Player of the Year. He was selected to participate in the 2015 McDonald's All-American Boys Game as well as the 2015 Jordan Brand Classic and to represent the Team USA in the Nike Hoop Summit. As a senior, he repeated as the 2015 Illinois Gatorade Player of the Year and earned a third Associated Press All-state recognition (2nd first team). That year, he led Stevenson to the Illinois High School Association (IHSA) Class 4A championship. Following the season, he won Illinois Mr. Basketball. He completed his senior season in the 2014–15 academic year.

Brunson holds the IHSA playoff single-game and the IHSA Class 4A championship game scoring records and set the USA Basketball single-game assist record for the FIBA Americas Under-18 Championship. He earned the MVP of the 2015 FIBA Under-19 World Cup for the gold medal-winning Team USA.

He began his college career as the 2015–16 Big East Conference Preseason Freshman of the Year and was a Big East All-Freshman Team selection following the season. As a starter, he helped the 2015–16 Wildcats win the championship game of the 2016 NCAA Division I men's basketball tournament. As a sophomore, he was a unanimous 2016–17 All-Big East first team selection for the 2016–17 Wildcats. As a junior, he was the National Player of the Year and a Consensus first-team 2018 All-Americans and he helped the 2017–18 Wildcats win the championship game of the 2018 NCAA Division I men's basketball tournament to give Villanova their second National Championship in three years. On June 21, 2018, the Dallas Mavericks drafted Brunson with the 33rd overall pick. On July 12, 2022, he signed with the New York Knicks.

Early life
Born in New Brunswick, New Jersey, Brunson was raised in southern New Jersey until sixth grade. He is the son of Rick and Sandra Brunson. He has a sister Erica (born c. 2001). His parents met at Temple University where Rick played for the basketball team. Rick went on to spend nine seasons in the NBA. The family first settled in Cherry Hill, New Jersey but moved seven times before settling in Lincolnshire, Illinois in 2010 where Jalen played his high school career for Stevenson High School.

High school career

As a freshman, Brunson was an All–Lake County honorable mention selection in 2012, as Stevenson finished the season with a 17–11 record. During his sophomore season, Stevenson started the season 10–4 before going on a 19-game winning streak. That year, Brunson led Stevenson to the March 16, 2013, IHSA Class 4A championship game against Jabari Parker and Kendrick Nunn's three-time defending state champion Simeon Career Academy, where he got the Simeon backcourt in foul trouble in the first half before being held to one point in the second half of a 58–40 loss. Stevenson finished the season 29–5. Following the season, the Associated Press named him to the Class 4A All-state second team as the only sophomore on the first or second team. Brunson averaged 21.5 points that season.

On February 21, 2014, junior Brunson scored 57 points in a double overtime victory over Lake Forest High School. The performance gave him both the school single-game and career scoring records. On March 21, Brunson set the IHSA playoff single game scoring record against the Jahlil Okafor–led Whitney Young High School by scoring 56 points in a 75–68 state playoff semi-final loss. In the game, still images of a movement by Brunson appeared to be an obscene gesture, but video of the gesture were deemed to be inconclusive and an initial suspension for the subsequent consolation game was overturned. Brunson averaged 26.1 points, 5.4 rebounds, 4.7 assists, and 2.9 steals for a Stevenson team that finished the season with a 32–2 record. Two members of his high school team were National Football League athletes' offspring: Matt Morrissey and Cameron Green. Brunson was named Gatorade Player of the Year for the state of Illinois as a junior. Following the season, Associated Press named him as the only non-senior on the Class 4A All-state first team that also included Okafor, Cliff Alexander, Tyler Ulis and Sean O'Mara. He finished fourth in the 2014 Illinois Mr. Basketball voting. In April 2014, Illinois, Purdue, Kansas and Villanova had in-home visits. On May 3, 2014, he announced the eight schools that he was considering playing college basketball for: UConn, Michigan State, Illinois, Kansas, Purdue, Villanova, Michigan and Temple. That summer he was the number one rated point guard according to ESPN, although the class had a notable shortage of elite pure point guards. On June 25—the day after Jalen won a gold medal at the 2014 FIBA Americas Under-18 Championship—Rick Brunson received an offer as an on-bench assistant coach from Temple. The Temple offer fell through when Rick Brunson was arrested on various charges on July 25, and Temple fell out of the running for Jalen's services. Brunson participated in the July 9–11 LeBron James Skills Academy. On August 5, he announced official visits to Illinois on August 29–31, Villanova on September 4–6 and then Temple from September 11–13 and on August 9, he announced official visits to Michigan State from September 19–21 and Purdue on September 26–28.

On September 8, Brunson announced that he would be curtailing his recruitment and making his decision between Illinois and Villanova on September 10. On that date, Brunson committed to Villanova. At the time of his decision, he was ranked as the number one point guard in the national class of 2015 by Scout.com. Stevenson was a preseason top-10 team in the MaxPreps national high school rankings. A lot was expected of Brunson's team after losing to teams led by Parker and Okafor in the IHSA tournament final four in 2013 and 2014 even though no team from Lake County has ever won a state basketball championship. The team rattled off 11 straight victories to start the season before losing 88–81 to Chaminade Prep and its star Jayson Tatum in the Cancer Research Classic in Wheeling, WV, despite 48 points from Brunson. On January 17, Brunson and Stevenson faced Derryck Thornton, Jr. and Findlay Prep at the Hoophall Classic. At the time, Brunson was the number 3 ranked point guard in the class of 2015 and Thornton was the number 2 ranked point guard in the class of 2016 for the number 1 team in the country according to USA Today. Findlay, who was led by Arizona signee Allonzo Trier's 27 points, held Brunson to 26 in the second loss of the season for Stevenson, who had been 15–1. On January 28, he was named to the 2015 McDonald's All-American Boys Game roster, becoming the second player from Lake County to earn such recognition. On February 2, he was named to the 11-man Team USA for the Nike Hoop Summit. On February 21, Stevenson lost to Simeon as Brunson posted 25 points on 9–24 shooting, ending a 22-game in-state streak in a game that featured the top two teams in the state. The Simeon frontline featured three Big Ten Conference signees: D. J. Williams (Illinois), Ed Morrow (Nebraska) and Isaiah Moss (Iowa). On March 5, he was named to the Jordan Brand Classic roster.

On March 17, Brunson helped Stevenson qualify for a third consecutive appearance in the IHSA final four with a victory over Riverside Brookfield Township High School. In the game, Brunson became the Lake County career scoring record holder. On March 19, Brunson received the highest vote total for the Illinois Class 4A Associated Press All-state team. On March 20, he repeated as Illinois Gatorade Player of the Year. Brunson led Stevenson to the IHSA final four for a third consecutive time, but he led the team to the first state championship by a Lake county school with an IHSA Class 4A title-game record 30 points in a 57–40 victory over Normal Community High School. Brunson was 9-for-15 from the field and 9-for-9 from the free throw line. 2015 was Lake county's ninth consecutive year with a team reaching the IHSA final four; Stevenson became the first school in the large school division and the third school overall to win IHSA football and basketball state championships in the same year. The win got him out of the shadow of IHSA final four losses to Parker- and Okafor-led teams. Following the season, he won Illinois Mr. Basketball with 552 points and 99 of the 132 first place votes, ahead of fellow Jordan Brand All-American selection Charles Matthews, who had 157 points. Brunson finished his senior season with averages of 23.3 points, 5.2 assists, and 4.7 rebounds per game and with shooting percentages of 38% on three-point shots and 83% on free throws. At the March 30 POWERADE Jam Fest associated with the McDonald's All-American game, Brunson won the skills competition over finalists Carlton Bragg and Isaiah Briscoe and was a finalist for the three-point shooting contest. Brunson was a first-team Parade All-American, as well as a third-team USA Today All-USA high school basketball team selection. In the April 11 Nike Hoops Summit, Brunson had 12 points and seven assists in a 103–101 loss. In the April 17 Jordan Brand Classic, Brunson had a game-high three steals. He finished his high school career ranked No. 16 in the ESPN 100 and as the #2-point guard behind Isaiah Briscoe.

Recruiting 

Brunson, like his father, is a left-handed basketball player. In what was regarded as a weak point guard class, Brunson was the only true point guard that was ranked in the top 25 players at the conclusion of the class of 2015's junior season. In addition to high ratings by the recruiting services, Brunson's peers voted him to be the best passer in high school basketball prior to his senior season.

College career

Freshman season
Brunson was a selection to the 20-man Bob Cousy Award preseason watchlist. He was also selected as the 2015–16 Big East Conference Preseason Freshman of the Year by the conference coaches although Henry Ellenson was the only freshman selected to the 2015–16 Preseason All-Big East First or Second Team. Brunson's 2015–16 Wildcats were the unanimous coaches preseason selection to win the conference. In preseason top 100 player rankings Brunson was ranked 46 by ESPN and 41 by NBC Sports. During the preseason, Mike Rutherford of SB Nation selected Brunson as one of its 10 most important college basketball players for 2015–16. He made the initial 50-man John R. Wooden Award watch list on November 17. On December 2, Brunson earned recognition on the 18-man Wayman Tisdale Award watchlist.

Brunson opened the season in the starting lineup with 12 points and 4 assists against the Fairleigh Dickinson Knights on November 13. On November 26 in the semi-finals of the NIT Season Tip-Off against Stanford, Brunson posted 18 points. On December 28, he posted a then career-high 22 points against Penn. The 22-point effort was part of a 3–0 week for Villanova in which Brunson averaged 15.3 points and earned Big East Freshman of the Week. On February 8, the 2015–16 Wildcats became the first Villanova Wildcats men's basketball team to reach number one in the AP Poll by climbing to the top of the 2015–16 NCAA Division I men's basketball rankings. Following the 2015–16 Big East season, he was a unanimous Big East All-Freshman Team selection. In the 2016 NCAA Division I men's basketball tournament regional final against Kansas Brunson made the final two free throws that gave the Wildcats a two-possession lead with 3.5 seconds left. The 2015–16 Wildcats won the championship game of the tournament by defeating the North Carolina Tar Heels 77–74, with Brunson as a starter.

Sophomore season

Brunson was a selection to the 20-man Bob Cousy Award preseason watchlist again as a sophomore. He was a preseason All-Big East honorable mention selection. On December 5, the 2016–17 Wildcats ascended into the top position in the 2016–17 NCAA Division I men's basketball rankings. The following night, Brunson posted a then career-high 26 points in a Philadelphia Big 5 win over La Salle. After helping guide Villanova to a victory in its 2016–17 Big East season opener against DePaul on December 28, Brunson scored a career high 27 points in an 80–70 December 31 win over No. 10 Creighton to propel No. 1 Villanova to a 14–0 record and 2–0 in conference play. These two performances earned Brunson Big East player of the week recognition on January 2. Brunson was named to the February 9 Naismith Award Top 30 watch list. On February 18, against Seton Hall, Brunson posted his first career double double with a career-high 10 assists and 22 points. Following the regular season, he was one of four unanimous selections to the 2016–17 All-Big East first team. After averaging 14.7 points and 4.1 assists as a sophomore, Brunson decided to return to Villanova for his junior season. After the season ended and the 2017 NBA draft class was finalized, Brunson was projected to be a preseason All-American by NBC Sports.

Junior season
He was the 2017–18 preseason All-Big East player of the year. He was a pre-season All-American selection by Associated Press (1st team) and ESPN (2nd team). He was a preseason John R. Wooden Award, Oscar Robertson Trophy, Lute Olson Award and Naismith College Player of the Year watchlist honoree. Brunson led Villanova to the championship of the 2017 Battle 4 Atlantis, earning the MVP of the tournament and being recognized on November 27 as the Big East Player of the Week. On December 13, Brunson scored a career-high 31 points, including 22 in the first half, to lift the Wildcats over Temple 87–67. The next time he would score 31 points in a game was on December 30, 2017, when Villanova lost its first game of the season to Butler. He posted a third 31-point total on January 28 to help Villanova to an 85–82 victory over Marquette.

Brunson was named as an Academic All-District selection, making him one of 40 finalists for the 15-man Academic All-America team. He was named as one of 10 semi-finalists for the Naismith Award. He was named as one of 20 late-season finalists for the Wooden Award. Following the regular season, Brunson was one of three unanimous 2017–18 All-Big East selections, and he was named both the Big East Conference Men's Basketball Player of the Year and the Big East Scholar-Athlete of the Year a few days later. As a scholar, he was on pace to graduate during the summer after his junior season. He was a consensus first-team All-American after being selected as a first-team All-American by Sporting News, USBWA, Associated Press, and NABC. He was also awarded the USBWA Oscar Robertson Trophy the Associated Press College Basketball Player of the Year, the Naismith College Player of the Year, the John R. Wooden Award, the NABC Player of the Year, CBS Sports National Player of the Year, the Bob Cousy Award, and Sporting News Player of the Year. Brunson was a second-team Academic All-America selection. Brunson was named Most Outstanding Player of the East Region and was joined on the East Region All-tournament team by Omari Spellman and Eric Paschall. Villanova won the National Championship Game of the 2018 NCAA men's basketball tournament. Following his junior season, he declared for the 2018 NBA draft and hired an agent.

On December 17, 2019, Brunson was named college basketball player of the decade by Sporting News.

Professional career

Dallas Mavericks (2018–2022)
On June 21, 2018, the Dallas Mavericks drafted Brunson with the 33rd overall pick. He was the fourth and final Villanova player to be selected in the 2018 NBA draft. Brunson did not sign until after he completed his 2018 NBA Summer League play and was accorded a 4-year contract similar to a first round selection with 3-years guaranteed. He made his NBA debut on October 17, 2018, recording three points, one rebound, and an assist, in a 100–121 loss against the Phoenix Suns. After coming off the bench for his first four NBA games, Brunson started in place of the injured Dennis Smith Jr. on October 26, against the Toronto Raptors, scoring eight points, four assists, and three rebounds. On November 8, Brunson posted 11 points against Utah Jazz. Brunson replaced Smith in the starting lineup and posted career highs of 14 points on December 8 against the Houston Rockets and 17 points on December 10 against the Orlando Magic. On January 5, he was honored by the Philadelphia Sports Writers Association as its Amateur Athlete of the Year. That same night, with J. J. Barea and Devin Harris sidelined, Brunson posted 13 points, a career-high 11 rebounds, and what was then a career-high eight assists against the Philadelphia 76ers for his first professional double-double. Starting in place of Luka Dončić on February 22, Brunson posted a then career-high 22 points against the Denver Nuggets. On March 12, 2019, Brunson improved upon his career high with 34 points with five rebounds, four assists, and a steal in a 105–112 loss to the San Antonio Spurs. On April 7, Brunson posted a then career-high ten assists along with 12 points against the Memphis Grizzlies for his second career double-double.

With Dončić out of the lineup on December 16, 2019, and Brunson starting, the 2019–20 Mavericks ended an 18-game win streak by the Milwaukee Bucks, on a night when Brunson posted a career-high 11 assists and his first double-double of the season (13 points). On March 13, 2020, Brunson was reported to have undergone surgery to fix a labrum injury in his right shoulder. During the 2020–21 NBA season, Brunson averaged career highs in points, rebounds, and assists, finishing fourth in voting for the NBA Sixth Man of the Year Award. 

In the 2021–22 NBA season, Brunson became a starter and again finished the season achieving career highs in points, rebounds, and assists. On April 16, 2022, during Game 1 of the first round of the playoffs, Brunson logged 24 points, seven rebounds, and five assists in a 93–99 loss to the Utah Jazz. On April 18, during Game 2 of the first round of the playoffs, Brunson put up a career-high 41 points, along with eight rebounds and five assists in a 110–104 win over the Jazz. On May 15, Brunson scored 24 points and grabbed six rebounds in a 123–90 Game 7 blowout win against the overall one-seed Phoenix Suns, securing the Mavericks a place in the Western Conference Finals. On May 20, during Game 2 of the Western Conference Finals, Brunson recorded 31 points, 7 rebounds and 5 assists in a 126–117 loss against the Golden State Warriors.

New York Knicks (2022–present)
On July 12, 2022, Brunson signed a four-year, $104 million contract with his hometown team the New York Knicks. The Knicks were later punished for engaging in conversations with Brunson before the free agency window opened. On October 19, he made his Knicks debut in a 115–112 loss in overtime to the Memphis Grizzlies, scoring 15 points along with nine assists and six rebounds. On October 26, Brunson scored 27 points, recorded 13 assists, and grabbed seven rebounds during a 134–131 overtime victory against the Charlotte Hornets. 

On January 4, 2023, Brunson scored 38 points, alongside seven rebounds and six assists in a 117–114 win over the San Antonio Spurs. On January 9, Brunson put up a career-high 44 points in a 111–107 loss to the Milwaukee Bucks. On January 16, Brunson was recognized as NBA Eastern Conference player of the Week for the week of January 9–15 after averaging 34.8 points, 5.8 rebounds and 5.0 assists with 3 30-point games as the Knicks went 3–1 for the week. It was his first career NBA Player of the Week award. On January 18, Brunson scored 32 points in a 116–105 loss against the Washington Wizards. He scored 25-plus points in eight straight games, the longest streak by a New York Knicks guard since Dick Barnett in 1965. Barnett logged 25 or more points in 12 consecutive contests. 

On February 4, Brunson scored 41 points on 14-of-19 shooting, 5-of-7 from three, 8-of-10 from the free throw line, along with five rebounds and seven assists in a 134–128 overtime loss against the Los Angeles Clippers.  On February 8, Villanova retired his jersey. On February 13, Brunson put up 40 points on 15-of-21 shooting from the field and added five assists in a 124–106 win over the Brooklyn Nets. He also tied Stephon Marbury for the most 40-point games in a season in Knicks history. On March 1, Brunson scored 39 points (30 points in the first half) on 15-of-18 shooting, 5-of-6 from three, 4-of-4 from the free throw line in a 142–118 win over the Brooklyn Nets. On March 2, Brunson won his first NBA Player of the Month award when he was named the NBA Eastern Conference Player of the Month for February. He finished the month with 27.3 points and 6.0 assists while shooting 42.6% from 3-point range and 52.9% overall. The Knicks went 9–2, finishing out the month with six straight wins.

National team career

On May 5, 2014, USA Basketball announced the 21 athletes (including Brunson) invited to try out from June 10 to 19 for the 12-member USA national team for the June 20–24, 2014 FIBA Americas Under-18 Championship. Eventually, 24 players tried out for the team and the roster was cut to 15 on June 12. Brunson made the final 12-man roster that was announced on June 15. In the opening game, Brunson surpassed Stephon Marbury's 12 assists against Brazil in the 1994 FIBA Americas U18 Championship by recording 13 against Uruguay to set a new USA Basketball U18 single-game assist record. The United States claimed a gold medal in the tournament. On August 16, Brunson was named to the Nike Global Challenge USA All-Tournament team along with Stephen Zimmerman, D. J. Hogg, Malik Monk, Jaylen Brown, and Bam Adebayo. Brunson led the Midwest team to a third-place finish in the eight-team tournament.

On June 18, 2015, Brunson was announced as a member of the 12-man 2015 USA Basketball Men's U19 World Cup Team for the 2015 FIBA Under-19 World Cup. Brunson earned MVP of the tournament, after leading the team with 5.6 assists and 2.1 steals for the tournament. He posted a game-high 30 points in the semi-finals against Greece, and he tallied a team-high 14 points including six in overtime as well as seven assists, five rebounds, and a steal in the gold medal game against Croatia. Brunson tied teammate Harry Giles, with a 14.0 average for the tournament. He dominated in the final two games. Based on this performance, he was recognized as the USA Basketball Male Athlete of the Year, on December 21.

Career statistics

NBA

Regular season

|-
| style="text-align:left;"| 
| style="text-align:left;"| Dallas
| 73 || 38 || 21.8 || .467 || .348 || .725 || 2.3 || 3.2 || .5 || .1 || 9.3
|-
| style="text-align:left;"| 
| style="text-align:left;"| Dallas
| 57 || 16 || 17.9 || .466 || .358 || .813 || 2.4 || 3.3 || .4 || .1 || 8.2
|-
| style="text-align:left;"| 
| style="text-align:left;"| Dallas
| 68 || 12 || 25.0 || .523 || .405 || .795 || 3.4 || 3.5 || .5 || .0 || 12.6
|-
| style="text-align:left;"|
| style="text-align:left;"|Dallas
| 79 || 61 || 31.9 || .502 || .373 || .840|| 3.9 || 4.8 || .8 || .0 || 16.3
|- class="sortbottom"
| style="text-align:center;" colspan="2"| Career
| 277 || 127 || 24.7 || .494 || .373 || .800 || 3.0 || 3.7 || .6 || .0 || 11.9

Playoffs

|-
| style="text-align:left;"| 
| style="text-align:left;"| Dallas
| 7 || 0 || 16.3 || .455 || .462 || .749 || 2.6 || 1.4 || .0 || .0 || 8.0
|-
| style="text-align:left;"| 
| style="text-align:left;"| Dallas
| 18 || 18 || 34.9 || .466 || .347 || .800 || 4.6 || 3.7 || .8 || .1 || 21.6
|- class="sortbottom"
| style="text-align:center;" colspan="2"| Career
| 25 || 18 || 29.7 || .465 || .364 || .796 || 4.0 || 3.0 || .6 || .0 || 17.8

College

|-
| style="text-align:left;"| 2015–16
| style="text-align:left;"| Villanova
| 40 || 39 || 24.0 || .452 || .383 || .774 || 1.8 || 2.5 || .7 || .0 || 9.6
|-
| style="text-align:left;"| 2016–17
| style="text-align:left;"| Villanova
| 36 || 36 || 31.1 || .541 || .378 || .876 || 2.6 || 4.1 || .9 || .0 || 14.7
|-
| style="text-align:left;"| 2017–18
| style="text-align:left;"| Villanova
| 40 || 40 || 31.8 || .521 || .408 || .802 || 3.1 || 4.6 || .9 || .0 || 18.9
|- class="sortbottom"
| style="text-align:center;" colspan="2"| Career
| 116 || 115 || 28.9 || .510 || .393 || .820 || 2.5 || 3.7 || .8 || .0 || 14.4

References

External links

Villanova Wildcats bio
USA Basketball bio
ESPN page

1996 births
Living people
21st-century African-American sportspeople
African-American basketball players
All-American college men's basketball players
American men's basketball players
Basketball players from Illinois
Basketball players from New Jersey
Dallas Mavericks draft picks
Dallas Mavericks players
McDonald's High School All-Americans
New York Knicks players
Parade High School All-Americans (boys' basketball)
People from Cherry Hill, New Jersey
People from Lincolnshire, Illinois
Point guards
Sportspeople from Camden County, New Jersey
Sportspeople from the Chicago metropolitan area
Sportspeople from New Brunswick, New Jersey
Villanova Wildcats men's basketball players